Kalle Myllymaa (born 25 March 2002) is a Finnish ice hockey player who plays for Porin Ässät of the Liiga. He plays as a center, but can play as a winger if needed.

Career 
Myllymaa started ice hockey in Ässät when he was 5 years old. in the 2017-18 season he was the captain of the C-junior team. He was the team's best player by goals. He also played for the B2-junior team in the playoffs which ended in a silver medal. In the 2020-21 season he played as captain for the U20 team.

Myllymaa played his Liiga debut on 18 September 2021 against Oulun Kärpät.

Career statistics

References 

Ässät players
Finnish ice hockey forwards
2002 births
People from Pori
Living people